The Atlantic lizard (Gallotia atlantica) is a species of lizards in the family Lacertidae.
It is endemic to the eastern Canary Islands Lanzarote and Fuerteventura and the smaller islands surrounding them.

Its natural habitats are temperate forests, temperate shrubland, Mediterranean-type shrubby vegetation, rocky areas, rocky shores, sandy shores, arable land, pastureland, and rural gardens.

References

Gallotia
Reptiles of the Canary Islands
Reptiles described in 1882
Taxa named by Wilhelm Peters
Taxa named by Giacomo Doria
Taxonomy articles created by Polbot